Blue Skies is a Canadian short drama film, directed by Ann Marie Fleming and released in 2002. Created as a personal response to the September 11 attacks and told without dialogue, the film stars Alessandro Juliani as a Chinese opera performer who cannot stop crying in his dressing room, and Stephanie Morgenstern as a costume master who patiently dresses him and calms him down before his scheduled performance of Irving Berlin's song "Blue Skies".

The film premiered in August 2002 at the Montreal World Film Festival. It was subsequently screened at the 2002 Toronto International Film Festival, where it was named the winner of the Best Canadian Short Film award. It was a Genie Award nominee for Best Live Action Short Drama at the 23rd Genie Awards in 2003.

References

External links

2002 films
2002 short films
Canadian drama short films
2000s Canadian films
Films about Asian Canadians
Films directed by Ann Marie Fleming